Yardley is a borough in Bucks County, Pennsylvania. Yardley borders the Delaware River and Ewing, New Jersey to its east and Lower Makefield Township to its north, west, and south. The United States Post Office assigns many addresses in Lower Makefield Township the preferred city of "Yardley", although they are outside the borough. The population was 2,434 at the 2010 census. Yardley is part of the Delaware Valley metropolitan area.

Geography
Yardley is located at  (40.241508, -74.836325).

The Delaware Canal and its towpath bisect the borough from northwest to southeast. Access points to the canal are located at Edgewater Avenue, Afton Avenue, Fuld Avenue, College Avenue and South Canal Street.

The Yardley station, a SEPTA Regional Rail station, is located on Main Street.

Demographics

As of the 2010 census, the borough was 89.7% Non-Hispanic White, 3.5% Black or African American, 2.6% Asian, and 1.9% were two or more races. 2.5% of the population were of Hispanic or Latino ancestry.

As of the census of 2000, there were 2,498 people, 1,170 households, and 649 families residing in the borough. The population density was 2,729.0 people per square mile (1,048.4/km). There were 1,209 housing units at an average density of 1,320.8 per square mile (507.4/km). The racial makeup of the borough was 93.63% White, 3.44% African American, 0.08% Native American, 1.20% Asian, 0.04% Pacific Islander, 0.52% from other races, and 1.08% from two or more races. 1.76% of the population were Hispanic or Latino of any race.

There were 1,170 households, out of which 24.4% had children under the age of 18 living with them, 43.9% were married couples living together, 8.6% had a female householder with no husband present, and 44.5% were non-families. 37.0% of all households were made up of individuals, and 10.8% had someone living alone who was 65 years of age or older. The average household size was 2.14 and the average family size was 2.86.

In the borough, the population was spread out, with 20.4% under the age of 18, 4.8% from 18 to 24, 35.3% from 25 to 44, 24.9% from 45 to 64, and 14.7% who were 65 years of age or older. The median age was 40 years. For every 100 females, there were 90.7 males. For every 100 females age 18 and over, there were 86.3 males.

The median income for a household in the township was $58,221, and the median income for a family was $70,938. Males had a median income of $50,816 versus $41,893 for females. The per capita income for the township was $32,802. About 1.7% of families and 3.1% of the population were below the poverty line, including 2.6% of those under age 18 and 3.3% of those age 65 or over.

History

Yardley was founded by William Yardley, who emigrated to America in July, 1682 with his family. He made an agreement with William Penn, before leaving England, to buy  for ten pounds. A survey was completed in October 1682, and the area William Yardley settled was called "Prospect Farm." It was located just outside the present Yardley Borough. William Yardley died in 1693, and his family in 1702–1703, possibly of smallpox. The family's burial plots are located in Slate Hill Cemetery, one of the oldest Quaker burial grounds in the state. 

A nephew, Thomas Yardley, came to America in 1704 to settle the estate and never returned to England. He opened a ferry line which started operating in 1710 from Letchworth Avenue, the lower boundary of the village, and landed in New Jersey further downstream. This was an important link between West Jersey and the three roads leading to Philadelphia by way of Falls, Langhorne and Newtown. The Yardley family occupied the land for more than 150 years.
When Yardley was founded there were already small settlements at nearby Burlington, Bristol, and Falls Ferry.

Yardley began to develop into a village about 1807, and by 1880 had a population of 820. Early industries included a spoke and handle factory, sawmill, felloe factory, plate and plaster mill, and two flour mills. The first post office, established in 1828, used the name "Yardleyville." The name became "Yardley" again at the time the Reading Railroad came through the area in 1876.

During the American Civil War, Yardley was a station for the Underground Railroad, an escape route for slaves. Known hiding places were under the eaves of the Continental Hotel (now the Continental Tavern), in bins of warehouses on the Delaware Canal (completed in 1862), and at the General Store (now Worthington Insurance). At Lakeside, the yellow house facing Lake Afton on N. Main Street, one brick-walled cellar room is also thought to have been a hiding place.

Yardley Borough was incorporated on March 4, 1895.

The Train Collectors Association, which now boasts worldwide membership of 30,000 individuals, was founded in Yardley in 1954.

The former Bridge in Yardley Borough, Washington Crossing State Park, and Yardley Historic District are listed on the National Register of Historic Places.

Transportation

Pennsylvania Route 32 runs through Yardley adjacent to the Delaware River, heading south to Morrisville and north to New Hope and beyond and is a scenic byway. Pennsylvania Route 332 heads west from PA 32 in Yardley and leads to Newtown.

The Philadelphia to Bound Brook, New Jersey, two-track main line of the Philadelphia and Reading Railroad passed through (and stopped) at Yardley, It crossed the Delaware River on a still standing massive stone viaduct called the West Trenton Railroad Bridge. This line now is SEPTA Regional Rail's West Trenton Line and operates also as a CSX freight line called the Trenton Subdivision. 

SEPTA trains along the West Trenton Line stop at the Yardley station. Prior to the 1950s, the Baltimore and Ohio Railroad's New York City-bound trains from Washington, D.C., (Royal Blue, Capitol Limited, National Limited, Ambassador, and others) used the Reading's trackage to Bound Brook as did the Reading's Crusader.

Historic timeline

 1876: The North Pennsylvania Railroad first constructed the railroad through Yardley in 1876 and was leased by the Reading Railroad for 100 years, starting in 1879, to become part of the Reading's eventual line to Bound Brook, New Jersey.
 1843: The United States Postal Service changed the name of the town to Yardley from Yardleyville. This was to avoid confusion with the New York City/Philadelphia train line that made a stop here and at Yardville, New Jersey.
 1895: Yardley is incorporated as a Borough within Lower Makefield Township.
 1955: Flooding caused by hurricanes Connie and Diane wiped out the bridge to New Jersey.
 1961: Scudder Falls Bridge opens, just outside the borough.
 1976:  The historic but now bankrupt Reading Railroad becomes part of CONRAIL along with other bankrupt eastern railroads.
 1984: The first DMV office opens in Yardley Boro PJ'S Auto Tags
 1996: Due to student overpopulation of Quarry Hill Elementary School on Quarry Rd near Creamery Rd, Afton Elementary School was constructed in the adjacent lot.
 1997: A notable jewelry store in Yardley proper suffered damage from a fire. This caused quite a stir in the community. The cause of the fire was determined to be from a cigarette inserted into the building from the exterior.
 2004: Hurricane Ivan causes worst flood since 1955.
 2005: On April 4, the Delaware River crested higher than after Hurricane Ivan. The cause was rain and snow melt.
 2006: In late June, there was more flooding of the Delaware River.
 2011: In early September, there was even more flooding.

Climate
According to the Köppen climate classification system, Yardley has a Humid subtropical climate (Cfa). Cfa climates are characterized by all months having an average mean temperature > , at least four months with an average mean temperature ≥ , at least one month with an average mean temperature ≥  and no significant precipitation difference between seasons. Although most summer days are slightly humid in Yardley, episodes of heat and high humidity can occur with heat index values > . The average wettest month is July, which corresponds with the annual peak in thunderstorm activity. Episodes of extreme cold and wind can occur, with wind chill values < . Ice storms and large snowstorms depositing ≥  of snow occur once every few years, particularly during nor’easters from December through February.

Ecology

According to the A. W. Kuchler U.S. potential natural vegetation types, Yardley would have a dominant vegetation type of Appalachian Oak (104) with a dominant vegetation form of Eastern Hardwood Forest (25). The spring bloom typically begins by April 7 and fall color usually peaks by November 3.

Notable people
Susan Abulhawa, Palestinian American writer and political activist
Bill Bamberger, documentary photographer and photojournalist
Bill Barretta, puppeteer who joined the Muppets in 1991.
Robert Costa, reporter for The Washington Post and moderator of PBS's "Washington Week"
David Curtiss, competitive swimmer, national high school record setter in the 50-yard freestyle, 2020 US Olympic Trials finalist.
Hallie Jackson, NBC News Correspondent 
Kristin Minter, model and actress from Home Alone and ER.
Jimmy Ockford, professional soccer player for Colorado Springs Switchbacks FC
Brian O'Neill, Right Wing and player for the New Jersey Devils AHL affiliate and member of the 2018 USA Olympic hockey team.
Aileen Quinn, actress who starred in the 1982 film Annie.
Meghan Roche, fashion model
Matthew Schuler, singer, contestant on The Voice
Bo Welch, actor
Algernon Cadwallader, band
Zach Woods, Actor who starred in The Office, Silicon Valley, and Veep.

References

External links

Official website

1682 establishments in Pennsylvania
Boroughs in Bucks County, Pennsylvania
Historic districts in Bucks County, Pennsylvania
Historic districts on the National Register of Historic Places in Pennsylvania
National Register of Historic Places in Bucks County, Pennsylvania
Pennsylvania populated places on the Delaware River
Populated places established in 1682
Populated places on the Underground Railroad